Sistem Kenderaan Seremban – Kuala Lumpur Sdn Bhd (doing business as SKS-KL) is a private transport company owned by Nadi Bhd.

History
It was formed in 1977. It is based in Terminal One Mall, Seremban. It serves as the biggest express bus provider from Seremban to Kuala Lumpur and other destinations. SKS owns a fleet of Nissan Diesel, Hino, Silverbus, Scania AB, Mercedes-Benz and Volvo buses to serve all its routes. Some 5,000 people use SKS services on normal days and double the number on weekends.

Routes

SKS, a unit of Nadi Corp Holdings Sdn Bhd, operates coach services along the North-South Expressway.

Fleet
As of 2014, these fleet had used intercity coaches (Scania L94IB, Scania K270IB and Scania K320IB).

References

External links
 Nadi Bhd

1977 establishments in Malaysia
Bus companies of Malaysia
Privately held companies of Malaysia